Notable events of 2002 in webcomics.

Events

Website Modern Tales launches on March 2.
Cool Beans World ceased operation in May.
Jenny Everywhere, the first open source super hero, was conceived on Barbelith discussion boards.
David Stenworth launches the Snafu Comics website.

Awards
Web Cartoonist's Choice Awards, "Best Comic" won by Fred Gallagher & Rodney Caston's Megatokyo.
Ignatz Awards, "Outstanding Online Comic" won by Jason Little's Bee.

Webcomics started

 January 17 — ArtBomb anthology by Warren Ellis, Colleen Doran, Andi Watson, Laurenn McCubbin and D'Israeli
 January 21 — El Goonish Shive by Dan Shive
 January 28 — Saturday Morning Breakfast Cereal by Zach Weiner
 January —  Buttercup Festival by Elliot G. Garbauskas
 February 14 — Van Von Hunter by Mike Schwark and Ron Kaulfersch
 February 15 — PartiallyClips by Rob Balder
 February 16 — Unshelved by Bill Barnes and Gene Ambaum
 February 25 — Nothing Nice To Say by Mitch Clem
 February — Saturnalia by Nina Matsumoto
 March 7 — Oh My Gods! by Shivian Balaris
 March 11 — Pibgorn by Brooke McEldowney
 April 11 — No Need for Bushido by Alex Kolesar and Joseph Kovell
 April — Copper by Kazu Kibuishi
 May 5 — Snafu Comics by David Stanworth
 May 12 — American Elf by James Kochalka
 June 3 — A Miracle of Science by Jon Kilgannon and Mark Sachs
 June 4 — Scary Go Round by John Allison
 June 14 — Pixel by Chris Dlugosz
 July 1 — Wigu by Jeffrey Rowland
 July 22 — Queen of Wands by Aeire
 August 5 — Theater Hopper by Tom Brazelton
 September 17 — NatalieDee by Natalie Dee
 October 23 — Ctrl+Alt+Del (webcomic) by Tim Buckley
 October 31 — Serenity Rose by Aaron Alexovich
 November 1 — Day by Day by Chris Muir
 November 1 — Errant Story by Michael Poe
 December 8 — Fuzzy Knights by Noah J. D. Chinn
 December — Demonology 101 by Faith Erin Hicks
 December  — Elsie Hooper by Robert D. Krzykowski
 Dicebox by Jenn Manley Lee
 Gods of Arr-Kelaan by Chuck Rowles
 Red String by Gina Biggs
 Sparkling Generation Valkyrie Yuuki by kittyhawk

Webcomics ended
 Bobbins by John Allison, 1998 – 2002
 Exploitation Now by Michael Poe, 2000 – 2002

References

 
Webcomics by year